1000 Arms is the fifteenth studio album by Canadian country rock band Blue Rodeo, released on October 28, 2016.

Track listing
All songs written by Greg Keelor and Jim Cuddy.
 "Hard to Remember" – 4:57
 "I Can't Hide This Anymore" – 3:21
 "Jimmy Fall Down" – 4:19
 "Long Hard Life" – 3:40
 "Rabbit's Foot" – 4:03
 "1000 Arms" – 4:33
 "Dust to Gold" – 4:40
 "Superstar" – 3:37
 "Mascara Tears" – 4:25
 "Can't Find My Way Back to You" – 5:21
 "So Hard to See" – 4:49
 "The Flame" –  6:31

Personnel
Tim Vesely, formerly the bassist for Canadian indie rock band Rheostatics, co-produced and engineered this album. "I Can't Hide This Anymore" and "Jimmy Fall Down" feature Canadian blues musician Jimmy Bowskill on mandolin.

Charts

References

Blue Rodeo albums
2016 albums